The 2010–11 season is Real Sociedad's 65th season in La Liga. After spending 3 seasons in the second tier of Spanish football the Basque club obtained promotion by topping the table in 2010.

This article shows player statistics and all matches (official and friendly) that the club played during the 2010–11 season.

Season summary
In the 2010–11 season, Real Sociedad played in the top division of Spanish football for the first time since being relegated in 2007. Some additions were made to the squad that had obtained promotion. Among them Joseba Llorente stood out, having cost €2.5 million.

The season started with a home victory against Villarreal. During the first half of the season, the club got an unexpectedly high point tally. Relegation looked extremely unlikely and optimism reigned. Later in the season, the shortcomings in Lasarte's approach became clear and the club was in free fall. On the last match day Real Sociedad avoided relegation and Deportivo de La Coruña were relegated instead.

At the end of the season, Lasarte was dismissed on the grounds that he did not give enough of a chance to academy players and that his style of play was rudimentary and unattractive.

Players

Squad information

Start formations
Starting XI
Lineup that started most of the club's competitive matches throughout the season.

|}

4–2–3–1 was the default formation during that season. Occasionally, Lasarte changed formation, resorting to a back 5 (Santander away) or in some cases adding a second forward (Levante away). In some other games (Atlético Madrid Away) Lasarte played three center-midfielders. The preferred partnership in center midfield was that of Aranburu and Rivas. Alternative choices, such as Bergara or Elustondo, proving to be unsuccessful. Up front, Llorente began strongly but after his injury he was replaced by Tamudo, who would eventually start more games and play more minutes.

Player statistics

Summer transfers 
Emilio Nsue and Carlos Bueno, who were instrumental to the club's promotion, returned to their original clubs, as did the less important Songo'o and Jonathan Estrada.

In the winter transfer window Agirretxe was close to being loaned to a second division club. However, a season-ending injury suffered by Joseba Llorente put an end to all speculation. Borja Viguera was loaned to Catalan second division club Gimnàstic due to lack of opportunities. After having played a handful of games, his season ended when he suffered an injury.

The club acquired some new players in order to reinforce its squad. Most of the signings were arguably failures. Jeffrey Sarpong was bought from Ajax for €200,000 and was mostly used as a substitute. Francisco Sutil, a free transfer, suffered a similar fate. Joseba Llorente, signed from Villarreal for €2.5 million, although impressive while fit, missed most of the season due to injury. Raúl Tamudo and Vadim Demidov were the most consistent signings that season. Finally, Diego Ifrán showed signs of his quality, despite coming back from injury much later than expected.

In

Out

Loan out

Loan return 
Italics for players returning to the club but left it during pre-season

Loan end

Club

Coaching staff

Pre-season
The club played a series of friendlies preparing for the new season. A brief stage in Austria allowed the club to play some foreign clubs.

Liga BBVA

Copa del Rey

As a result of losing on a 5–3 aggregate, Real Sociedad were knocked out

See also
2010–11 Copa del Rey
2010–11 La Liga

External links

Real Sociedad Fixtures and Results 2010-2011

Real Sociedad
Real Sociedad seasons